Marta Fraga Pérez (born 4 February 1985) is a former professional Spanish tennis player.

She won the French Open girls’ doubles championship in 2003 with her compatriot Adriana González Peñas.

As a professional, her highest career singles ranking is world No. 270, achieved on 11 October 2004. In November 2004, she peaked at No. 342 in the doubles rankings.

In her career, Fraga won nine singles and nine doubles titles on the ITF Circuit.

Junior Grand Slam finals

Doubles (1–0)

ITF finals

Singles: 13 (9–4)

Doubles: 14 (9–5)

External links
 
 

Spanish female tennis players
1985 births
Living people
French Open junior champions
Grand Slam (tennis) champions in girls' doubles